Rudnya is a town and the administrative center of Rudnyansky District in Smolensk Oblast, Russia, located on the Malaya Berezina River (Dnieper's basin)  northwest of Smolensk, the administrative center of the oblast. Population:

History

Rudnya (as the settlement of Rodnya) is first mentioned in 1363 since the lands were occupied by Andrei of Polotsk and included in the Principality of Smolensk. During Polish rule it was part of the Vitebsk Voivodeship. After the First Partition of Poland in 1772 the area was included into newly established Babinovichsky Uyezd of Mogilev Governorate. In 1840, the uyezd was abolished and merged into Orshansky Uyezd of the same governorate. In 1919, Mogilev Governorate was abolished, and Orshansky Uyezd was included into Gomel Governorate. In 1920, the uyezd was included into Vitebsk Governorate, and shortly the area was transferred to Smolensky Uyezd of Smolensk Governorate. In 1926, Rudnya was granted the town status.

On 12 July 1929, governorates and uyezds were abolished, and Rudnyansky District with the administrative center in Rudnya was established. The district belonged to Smolensk Okrug of Western Oblast. On August 1, 1930 the okrugs were abolished, and the districts were subordinated directly to the oblast. On 27 September 1937 Western Oblast was abolished and split between Oryol and Smolensk Oblasts. Rudnyansky District was transferred to Smolensk Oblast. Between 1941 and September 1943, during World War II, the district was occupied by German troops.

Rudnya is known as the maiden battle target of the famous Soviet multiple rocket launchers Katyusha. On July 14, 1941, an experimental artillery battery of seven launchers was first used in battle at Rudnya, under the command of Captain Ivan Flyorov, destroying a concentration of German troops with tanks, armored vehicles, and trucks at the marketplace, causing massive German Army casualties and its retreat from the town in panic.

Administrative and municipal status
Within the framework of administrative divisions, Rudnya serves as the administrative center of Rudnyansky District. As an administrative division, it is incorporated within Rudnyansky District as Rudnyanskoye Urban Settlement. As a municipal division, this administrative unit also has urban settlement status and is a part of Rudnyansky Municipal District.

Economy

Industry
80% of the industrial production in Rudnyansky District is produced by food industry. There is also production of shoes and of doors and windows.

Transportation
The railway connecting Smolensk with Vitebsk and further with Daugavpils passes Rudnya.

The R120 highway connecting Smolensk with the state border between Russia and Belarus, and continuing across the border to Vitebsk, passes Rudnya as well. The R130 highway connects Rudnya to Demidov.

Culture and recreation
Rudnya contains a number of protected cultural heritage monuments, including the monument to the first Katyusha rocket launcher military usage during World War II in Rudnya.

In Rudnya, there is a history museum and a museum-house of Mikhail Yegorov. The latter is a subdivision of Smolensk State Museum Reserve. Yegorov, who was born close to Rudnya, was one of the two Soviet soldiers who raised a flag over the Reichstag on 2 May 1945, after the Battle of Berlin.

Rudnya at one point had a Shtetl status, meaning that the village had a large concentration of Jews living in it. Jewish families first arrived after the Pale of Settlement was established in the western Russian Empire in 1791, granting Jews the legality to live in this settlement area. In 1926, there were 2235 Jews in Rudnya, nearly half of the village's population at the time. Many Jews in Rudnya moved to larger cities such as Leningrad and Smolensk in the early 1900s due to the newly established Communist driven industrial boom in larger cities. Of the nearly 2000 Jews who remained in the village during WWII, most were killed by the Nazis during the Holocaust after a ghetto was established in Rudnya. Local Jews were shot to death in several murder operations between 1941 and 1943.

Climate
Rudnya has a warm-summer humid continental climate (Dfb in the Köppen climate classification).

<div style="width:70%;">

References

Notes

Sources

External links
 The murder of the Jews of Rudnya during World War II, at Yad Vashem website.

Cities and towns in Smolensk Oblast
Orshansky Uyezd
Holocaust locations in Russia